Mingo Creek may refer to:

Mingo Creek (Monongahela River), Pennsylvania, a tributary of Monongahela River
Mingo Creek Viaduct
Mingo Creek (Mississippi), a stream in Mississippi
Mingo Creek (St. Francis River), a stream in Missouri
Mingo Creek (South Grand River), a stream in Missouri

See also
Minga Branch
Mingo Branch